{{DISPLAYTITLE:C9H8O4}}
The molecular formula C9H8O4 (molar mass: 180.15 g/mol, exact mass: 180.0423 u) may refer to:

 Acetozone
 Aspirin
 4-Hydroxyphenylpyruvic acid, a natural phenol
 Dihydroxycinnamic acids:
 Caffeic acid (3,4-Dihydroxycinnamic acid)
 Umbellic acid (2,4-dihydroxycinnamic acid)
 2,3-Dihydroxycinnamic acid
 2,5-Dihydroxycinnamic acid
 3,5-Dihydroxycinnamic acid
 Homophthalic acid
 Monomethyl phthalate
 Uvitic acid